Chi Aquarii, Latinized from χ Aquarii, is the Bayer designation of a star in the equatorial constellation of Aquarius. It is visible to the naked eye with an apparent visual magnitude of about 5.

This is a red giant star with a spectral classification of M3 III. It is classified as a semi-regular variable star and its brightness varies by an amplitude of 0.0636 in magnitude. The identified pulsation periods are 32.3, 38.5, and 44.9 days.

Notes

References

External links
 Image Chi Aquarii

219576
Aquarii, Chi
Aquarius (constellation)
Semiregular variable stars
M-type giants
Aquarii, 092
8850
114939
BD-08 6076